William Henry "Harry" Bailey (2 October 1870 – 19 October 1930) was an English cricketer, batting right-handed, an association football left back, and latterly a pub landlord. He was born at Melton Mowbray, Leicestershire, and has been dubbed "one of Victorian Leicester's sporting super stars"

Football
Bailey was a professional footballer who played for Leicester Fosse as a full-back. He played in the club's first ever games in both the Midlands' League and the Football League, he was the first player to reach 100 appearances for the club and also scored the Fosse's first ever penalty.

Cricket
Bailey made two first-class appearances for Leicestershire in the 1896 County Championship against Lancashire at Aigburth, Liverpool, and Derbyshire at Grace Road, Leicester. He scored 49 runs in his two matches, at an average of 12.25, with a high score of 15.

After his sporting career he became a pub landlord, of the Full Moon in Russel Square in Leicester. He died at the place of his birth on 19 October 1930.

References

External links
William Bailey at ESPNcricinfo
William Bailey at CricketArchive
Leicester City pub landlords: Harry Bailey – From Fosse and County to the Moon - Leicester Mercury story

1870 births
1930 deaths
Sportspeople from Melton Mowbray
Footballers from Leicestershire
Cricketers from Leicestershire
English cricketers
English footballers
Leicestershire cricketers
Leicester City F.C. players
Mansfield Town F.C. players
Association football fullbacks